OUBS, Otaniemi Underground Broadcasting System was the student television station of the Aalto University Student Union (AYY). 
In addition to broadcasting 24h on the Otaniemi cable network, OUBS offers its content on their website and over IPTV.
OUBS has a staff of 10 people working in the basement of Jämeräntaival 1 A, Espoo, Finland. The homes of the staff of OUBS, the studio and the editing facilities are all located in that same address.



History 
Construction of Otaniemi student village finished in the early 1950s. Soon after that a central radio named OtaRadio was established. The student village served as housing during the 1983 World Championships in Athletics. This led to building a cable-TV network serving the apartments. The cable network enabled the student union (TKY) to create its own channel, OtaTV. The former telephone exchange was transferred into a TV studio. OtaTV and OtaRadio soon merged and formed OUBS. Until the end of 20th century, OUBS also was responsible for maintaining the cable network, both infrastructure and channels.

External links 
www.oubs.fi - plug it in baby!
OUBS YouTube site
OUBS in Facebook
OUBS at Google Maps

Defunct television channels in Finland
Mass media in Espoo
Student television networks
Student television stations
Television channels and stations established in 1983
Television channels and stations disestablished in 2011